First California Mortgage Company (First Cal) is a mortgage lender based in Petaluma, California, with branches in Arizona, California, Colorado, Hawaii, Nevada, Texas, and Washington. First Cal is currently lending in these states plus Idaho, New Mexico and Oregon, and previously provided loans in 42 U.S. states. To date, First Cal has funded more than 300,000 home loans, mostly in California, and has a Better Business Bureau rating of A−. The company tagline is All the Way Home.

First Cal offers purchase and refinance programs with a variety of loan programs, including FHA, VA, HomePath, and jumbo loans.

History
First Cal was founded in 1977 by Dennis Hart to provide builder and retail financing. In 1986 they expanded, opening a wholesale division called Headlands Mortgage. First Cal sold its loan and servicing operations to a fortune 500 company in 1995. Three years later, Headlands was taken public (NASDAQ: HDLD) prior to being sold to GreenPoint Mortgage in 1999.

In 2003, First Cal resumed mortgage lending to serve mortgage brokers and retail borrowers in the San Francisco Bay Area behind President Christopher K Hart, son of Dennis Hart. Today, First Cal holds licenses to lend in 9 states.

Community service
First Cal is a silver sponsor and participates as a team in the American Cancer Society's Relay for Life. First Cal also participates in The Pajama Program, which provided pajamas and books to children in need.

References

Financial services companies established in 1977
Mortgage lenders of the United States